Conservatism is a cultural, social, and political philosophy that seeks to promote and to preserve traditional institutions, practices, and values. The central tenets of conservatism may vary in relation to the culture and civilization in which it appears. In Western culture, depending on the particular nation, conservatives seek to promote a range of social institutions such as the nuclear family, organized religion, the military, property rights, and monarchy. Conservatives tend to favor institutions and practices that guarantee stability and evolved gradually. Adherents of conservatism often oppose certain aspects of modernity (for example mass culture and secularism) and seek a return to traditional values, though different groups of conservatives may choose different traditional values to preserve.

The first established use of the term in a political context originated in 1818 with François-René de Chateaubriand during the period of Bourbon Restoration that sought to roll back the policies of the French Revolution. Historically associated with right-wing politics, the term has since been used to describe a wide range of views. There is no single set of policies regarded as conservative because the meaning of conservatism depends on what is considered traditional in a given place and time. Conservative thought has varied considerably as it has adapted itself to existing traditions and national cultures. For example, some conservatives advocate for greater economic intervention, while others advocate for a more laissez faire free-market economic system. Thus, conservatives from different parts of the world—each upholding their respective traditions—may disagree on a wide range of issues. Edmund Burke, an 18th-century politician who opposed the French Revolution but supported the American Revolution, is credited as one of the main theorists of conservatism in the 1790s.

Themes 
Some political scientists such as Samuel P. Huntington, have seen conservatism as situational. Under this definition, conservatives are seen as defending the established institutions of their time. According to Quintin Hogg, the chairman of the British Conservative Party in 1959: "Conservatism is not so much a philosophy as an attitude, a constant force, performing a timeless function in the development of a free society, and corresponding to a deep and permanent requirement of human nature itself". Conservatism is often used as a generic term to describe a "right-wing viewpoint occupying the political spectrum between liberalism and fascism".

Tradition 
Despite the lack of a universal definition, certain themes can be recognised as common across conservative thought. According to Michael Oakeshott, "To be conservative ... is to prefer the familiar to the unknown, to prefer the tried to the untried, fact to mystery, the actual to the possible, the limited to the unbounded, the near to the distant, the sufficient to the superabundant, the convenient to the perfect, present laughter to utopian bliss." Such traditionalism may be a reflection of trust in time-tested methods of social organisation, giving 'votes to the dead'. Traditions may also be steeped in a sense of identity.

Hierarchy
In contrast to the tradition-based definition of conservatism, some political theorists such as Corey Robin define conservatism primarily in terms of a general defense of social and economic inequality. In that way right-wing politics supports the view that certain social orders and hierarchies are inevitable, natural, normal, or desirable, typically supporting this position on the basis of natural law, economics, or tradition.  From this perspective, conservatism is less an attempt to uphold old institutions and more "a meditation on—and theoretical rendition of—the felt experience of having power, seeing it threatened, and trying to win it back". Conversely, some conservatives may argue that they are seeking less to protect their own power than they are seeking to protect "inalienable rights" and promote norms and rules that they believe should stand timeless and eternal, applying to each citizen.

Realism 
Conservatism has been called a "philosophy of human imperfection" by Noël O'Sullivan, reflecting among its adherents a negative view of human nature and pessimism of the potential to improve it through 'utopian' schemes. The "intellectual godfather of the realist right", Thomas Hobbes, argued that the state of nature for humans was "poor, nasty, brutish, and short", requiring centralised authority.

Reactionism 

In ideology, reactionism is a tradition in right-wing politics; the reactionary stance opposes policies for the social transformation of society, whereas conservatives seek to preserve the socio-economic structure and order that exists in the present. In popular usage, reactionary refers to a strong traditionalist conservative political perspective of a person opposed to social, political, and economic change. 

In political science, a reactionary or a reactionist is a person who holds political views that favor a return to the status quo ante, the previous political state of society, which that person believes possessed positive characteristics absent from contemporary society. As a descriptor term, reactionary derives from the ideological context of the left–right political spectrum. As an adjective, the word reactionary describes points of view and policies meant to restore a past status quo ante.

Forms

Liberal conservatism 

Liberal conservatism incorporates the classical liberal view of minimal government intervention in the economy. Individuals should be free to participate in the market and generate wealth without government interference. However, individuals cannot be thoroughly depended on to act responsibly in other spheres of life; therefore, liberal conservatives believe that a strong state is necessary to ensure law and order and social institutions are needed to nurture a sense of duty and responsibility to the nation. Liberal conservatism is a variant of conservatism that is strongly influenced by liberal stances.

As these latter two terms have had different meanings over time and across countries, liberal conservatism also has a wide variety of meanings. Historically, the term often referred to the combination of economic liberalism, which champions laissez-faire markets, with the classical conservatism concern for established tradition, respect for authority and religious values. It contrasted itself with classical liberalism, which supported freedom for the individual in both the economic and social spheres.

Over time, the general conservative ideology in many countries adopted fiscally conservative arguments and the term liberal conservatism was replaced with conservatism. This is also the case in countries where liberal economic ideas have been the tradition such as the United States and are thus considered conservative. In other countries where liberal conservative movements have entered the political mainstream, such as Italy and Spain, the terms liberal and conservative may be synonymous. The liberal conservative tradition in the United States combines the economic individualism of the classical liberals with a Burkean form of conservatism (which has also become part of the American conservative tradition, such as in the writings of Russell Kirk).

A secondary meaning for the term liberal conservatism that has developed in Europe is a combination of more modern conservative (less traditionalist) views with those of social liberalism. This has developed as an opposition to the more collectivist views of socialism. Often this involves stressing conservative views of free market economics and belief in individual responsibility, with communitarian views on defence of civil rights, environmentalism and support for a limited welfare state. In continental Europe, this is sometimes also translated into English as social conservatism.

Libertarian conservatism 

Libertarian conservatism describes certain political ideologies most prominently within the United States which combine libertarian economic issues with aspects of conservatism. Its four main branches are constitutionalism, paleolibertarianism, small government conservatism and Christian libertarianism. They generally differ from paleoconservatives, in that they favor more personal and economic freedom. Agorists such as Samuel Edward Konkin III labeled libertarian conservatism right-libertarianism.

In contrast to paleoconservatives, libertarian conservatives support strict laissez-faire policies such as free trade, opposition to any national bank and opposition to business regulations. They are vehemently opposed to environmental regulations, corporate welfare, subsidies and other areas of economic intervention. Many conservatives, especially in the United States, believe that the government should not play a major role in regulating business and managing the economy. They typically oppose efforts to charge high tax rates and to redistribute income to assist the poor. Such efforts, they argue, only serve to exacerbate the scourge of unemployment and poverty by lessening the ability for businesses to hire employees due to higher tax impositions.

Fiscal conservatism 

Fiscal conservatism is the economic philosophy of prudence in government spending and debt. In his Reflections on the Revolution in France (1790), Edmund Burke argued that a government does not have the right to run up large debts and then throw the burden on the taxpayer: [I]t is to the property of the citizen, and not to the demands of the creditor of the state, that the first and original faith of civil society is pledged. The claim of the citizen is prior in time, paramount in title, superior in equity. The fortunes of individuals, whether possessed by acquisition or by descent or in virtue of a participation in the goods of some community, were no part of the creditor's security, expressed or implied...[T]he public, whether represented by a monarch or by a senate, can pledge nothing but the public estate; and it can have no public estate except in what it derives from a just and proportioned imposition upon the citizens at large.

National conservatism 

National conservatism is a political term used primarily in Europe to describe a variant of conservatism which concentrates more on national interests than standard conservatism as well as upholding cultural and ethnic identity, while not being outspokenly nationalist or supporting a far-right approach. In Europe, national conservatives are usually eurosceptics.

National conservatism is heavily oriented towards the traditional family and social stability as well as in favour of limiting immigration. As such, national conservatives can be distinguished from economic conservatives, for whom free market economic policies, deregulation and fiscal conservatism are the main priorities. Some commentators have identified a growing gap between national and economic conservatism: "[M]ost parties of the Right [today] are run by economic conservatives who, in varying degrees, have marginalized social, cultural, and national conservatives". National conservatism is also related to traditionalist conservatism.

Traditionalist conservatism

Traditionalist conservatism is a political philosophy emphasizing the need for the principles of natural law and transcendent moral order, tradition, hierarchy and organic unity, agrarianism, classicism and high culture as well as the intersecting spheres of loyalty. Some traditionalists have embraced the labels "reactionary" and "counterrevolutionary", defying the stigma that has attached to these terms since the Enlightenment. Having a hierarchical view of society, many traditionalist conservatives, including a few Americans (notable examples including Ralph Adams Cram, Solange Hertz, William S. Lind, & Charles A. Coulombe), defend the monarchical political structure as the most natural and beneficial social arrangement.

Cultural conservatism 

Cultural conservatives support the preservation of the heritage of one nation, or of a shared culture that is not defined by national boundaries. The shared culture may be as divergent as Western culture or Chinese culture. In the United States, the term "cultural conservative" may imply a conservative position in the culture war. Cultural conservatives hold fast to traditional ways of thinking even in the face of monumental change. They believe strongly in traditional values and traditional politics and often have an urgent sense of nationalism.

Social conservatism 

Social conservatism is distinct from cultural conservatism, although there are some overlaps. Social conservatives may believe that society is built upon a fragile network of relationships which need to be upheld through duty, traditional values and established institutions; and that the government has a role in encouraging or enforcing traditional values or behaviours. A social conservative wants to preserve traditional morality and social mores, often by opposing what they consider radical policies or social engineering. Social change is generally regarded as suspect.

Social conservatives today generally favour the anti-abortion position in the abortion controversy and oppose human embryonic stem cell research (particularly if publicly funded); oppose both eugenics and human enhancement (transhumanism) while supporting bioconservatism; support a traditional definition of marriage as being one man and one woman; view the nuclear family model as society's foundational unit; oppose expansion of civil marriage and child adoption to couples in same-sex relationships; promote public morality and traditional family values; oppose atheism, especially militant atheism, and secularism; support the prohibition of drugs, prostitution and euthanasia; and support the censorship of pornography and what they consider to be obscenity or indecency.

Religious conservatism  

Religious conservatism principally applies the teachings of particular religions to politics: sometimes by merely proclaiming the value of those teachings; at other times, by having those teachings influence laws.

In most democracies, political conservatism seeks to uphold traditional family structures and social values. Religious conservatives typically oppose abortion, LGBT behavior (or, in certain cases, identity), drug use, and sexual activity outside of marriage. In some cases, conservative values are grounded in religious beliefs, and conservatives seek to increase the role of religion in public life.

Paternalistic conservatism 

Paternalistic conservatism is a strand in conservatism which reflects the belief that societies exist and develop organically and that members within them have obligations towards each other. There is particular emphasis on the paternalistic obligation of those who are privileged and wealthy to the poorer parts of society. Since it is consistent with principles such as organicism, hierarchy and duty, it can be seen as an outgrowth of traditional conservatism. Paternal conservatives support neither the individual nor the state in principle, but are instead prepared to support either or recommend a balance between the two depending on what is most practical. Paternalistic conservatives historically favor a more aristocratic view (as opposed to the more monarchist traditionalist conservatism) and are ideologically related to High Tories.

In more contemporary times, its proponents stress the importance of a social safety net to deal with poverty, support for limited redistribution of wealth along with government regulation of markets in the interests of both consumers and producers. Paternalistic conservatism first arose as a distinct ideology in the United Kingdom under Prime Minister Benjamin Disraeli's "One Nation" Toryism. There have been a variety of one nation conservative governments. In the United Kingdom, the Prime Ministers Disraeli, Stanley Baldwin, Neville Chamberlain, Winston Churchill, and Harold Macmillan were or are one nation conservatives.

In Germany, during the 19th-century German Chancellor Otto von Bismarck adopted policies of state-organized compulsory insurance for workers against sickness, accident, incapacity and old age. Chancellor Leo von Caprivi promoted a conservative agenda called the "New Course".

Progressive conservatism 

In the United States, Theodore Roosevelt has been the main figure identified with progressive conservatism as a political tradition. Roosevelt stated that he had "always believed that wise progressivism and wise conservatism go hand in hand". The Republican administration of President William Howard Taft was a progressive conservative and he described himself as "a believer in progressive conservatism" and President Dwight D. Eisenhower declared himself an advocate of "progressive conservatism".

In Canada, a variety of conservative governments have been part of the Red Tory tradition, with Canada's former major conservative party being named the Progressive Conservative Party of Canada from 1942 to 2003. In Canada, the Prime Ministers Arthur Meighen, R. B. Bennett, John Diefenbaker, Joe Clark, Brian Mulroney, and Kim Campbell led Red tory federal governments.

Authoritarian conservatism 

Authoritarian conservatism or reactionary conservatism refers to autocratic regimes that center their ideology around conservative nationalism, rather than ethnic nationalism, though certain racial components such as antisemitism may exist. Authoritarian conservative movements show strong devotion towards religion, tradition and culture while also expressing fervent nationalism akin to other far-right nationalist movements. Examples of authoritarian conservative leaders include António de Oliveira Salazar and Engelbert Dollfuss. Authoritarian conservative movements were prominent in the same era as fascism, with which it sometimes clashed. Although both ideologies shared core values such as nationalism and had common enemies such as communism and materialism, there was nonetheless a contrast between the traditionalist nature of authoritarian conservatism and the revolutionary, palingenetic and populist nature of fascism—thus it was common for authoritarian conservative regimes to suppress rising fascist and National Socialist movements. The hostility between the two ideologies is highlighted by the struggle for power for the National Socialists in Austria, which was marked by the assassination of Engelbert Dollfuss.

Sociologist Seymour Martin Lipset has examined the class basis of right-wing extremist politics in the 1920–1960 era. He reports:
Conservative or rightist extremist movements have arisen at different periods in modern history, ranging from the Horthyites in Hungary, the Christian Social Party of Dollfuss in Austria, Der Stahlhelm and other nationalists in pre-Hitler Germany, and Salazar in Portugal, to the pre-1966 Gaullist movements and the monarchists in contemporary France and Italy. The right extremists are conservative, not revolutionary. They seek to change political institutions in order to preserve or restore cultural and economic ones, while extremists of the centre and left seek to use political means for cultural and social revolution. The ideal of the right extremist is not a totalitarian ruler, but a monarch, or a traditionalist who acts like one. Many such movements in Spain, Austria, Hungary, Germany, and Italy-have been explicitly monarchist... The supporters of these movements differ from those of the centrists, tending to be wealthier, and more religious, which is more important in terms of a potential for mass support.

History

History of conservative thought 

In Great Britain, the Tory movement during the Restoration period (1660–1688) was a precursor to conservatism. Toryism supported a hierarchical society with a monarch who ruled by divine right. However, Tories differ from conservatives in that they opposed the idea that sovereignty derived from the people and rejected the authority of parliament and freedom of religion. Robert Filmer's Patriarcha: or the Natural Power of Kings (published posthumously in 1680, but written before the English Civil War of 1642–1651) became accepted as the statement of their doctrine. However, the Glorious Revolution of 1688 destroyed this principle to some degree by establishing a constitutional government in England, leading to the hegemony of the Tory-opposed Whig ideology. Faced with defeat, the Tories reformed their movement. They adopted more conservative positions, such as holding that sovereignty was vested in the three estates of Crown, Lords, and Commons rather than solely in the Crown. Richard Hooker (1554–1600), Marquess of Halifax (1633–1695) and David Hume (1711-1776) were proto-conservatives of the period. Halifax promoted pragmatism in government whilst Hume argued against political rationalism and utopianism.  Edmund Burke (1729–1797) has been widely regarded as the philosophical founder of conservatism. Burke served as the private secretary to the Marquis of Rockingham and as official pamphleteer to the Rockingham branch of the Whig party. Together with the Tories, they were the conservatives in the late 18th century United Kingdom. Burke's views were a mixture of conservatism and republicanism. He supported the American Revolution of 1775–1783 but abhorred the violence of the French Revolution (1789–1799). He accepted the conservative ideals of private property and the economics of Adam Smith (1723–1790), but thought that economics should remain subordinate to the conservative social ethic, that capitalism should be subordinate to the medieval social tradition and that the business class should be subordinate to aristocracy. He insisted on standards of honour derived from the medieval aristocratic tradition and saw the aristocracy as the nation's natural leaders. That meant limits on the powers of the Crown, since he found the institutions of Parliament to be better informed than commissions appointed by the executive. He favored an established church, but allowed for a degree of religious toleration. Burke ultimately justified the social order on the basis of tradition: tradition represented the wisdom of the species and he valued community and social harmony over social reforms.  Another form of conservatism developed in France in parallel to conservatism in Britain. It was influenced by Counter-Enlightenment works by men such as Joseph de Maistre (1753–1821) and Louis de Bonald (1754–1840). Many continental conservatives do not support separation of church and state, with most supporting state recognition of and cooperation with the Catholic Church, such as had existed in France before the Revolution. Conservatives were also early to embrace nationalism, which was previously associated with liberalism and the Revolution in France. Another early French conservative, François-René de Chateaubriand (1768–1848), espoused a romantic opposition to modernity, contrasting its emptiness with the 'full heart' of traditional faith and loyalty. Elsewhere on the continent, German thinkers Justus Möser (1720–1794) and Friedrich von Gentz (1764–1832) criticized the Declaration of the Rights of Man and of the Citizen that came of the Revolution. Opposition was also expressed by Adam Müller (1779–1829) and Georg Wilhelm Friedrich Hegel (1771–1830), the latter inspiring both left and right-wing followers.

Both Burke and Maistre were critical and skeptical of democracy in general, though their reasons differed. Maistre was pessimistic about humans being able to follow rules, while Burke was skeptical about humans' innate ability to make rules. For Maistre, rules had a divine origin, while Burke believed they arose from custom. The lack of custom for Burke, and the lack of divine guidance for Maistre, meant that people would act in terrible ways. Both also believed that liberty of the wrong kind led to bewilderment and political breakdown. Their ideas would together flow into a stream of anti-rationalist, romantic conservatism, but would still stay separate. Whereas Burke was more open to argumentation and disagreement, Maistre wanted faith and authority, leading to a more illiberal strain of thought.

History of conservative parties and movements 
Conservative political parties vary widely from country to country in the goals they wish to achieve. Both conservative and liberal parties tend to favor private ownership of property, in opposition to communist, socialist and green parties, which favor communal ownership or laws requiring social responsibility on the part of property owners. Where conservatives and liberals differ is primarily on social issues. Conservatives tend to reject behavior that does not conform to some social norm. Modern conservative parties often define themselves by their opposition to liberal or labor parties. The United States usage of the term "conservative" is unique to that country.

In Italy, which was united by liberals and radicals (Risorgimento), liberals, not conservatives, emerged as the party of the right. In the Netherlands, conservatives merged into a new Christian democratic party in 1980. In Austria, Germany, Portugal and Spain, conservatism was transformed into and incorporated into fascism or the far-right. In 1940, all Japanese parties were merged into a single fascist party. Following the war, Japanese conservatives briefly returned to politics, but were largely purged from public office.

Conservative elites have long dominated Latin American nations. Mostly, this has been achieved through control of and support for civil institutions, the church and the armed forces, rather than through party politics. Typically, the church was exempt from taxes and its employees immune from civil prosecution. Where national conservative parties were weak or non-existent, conservatives were more likely to rely on military dictatorship as a preferred form of government. However, in some nations where the elites were able to mobilize popular support for conservative parties, longer periods of political stability were achieved. Chile, Colombia and Venezuela are examples of nations that developed strong conservative parties. Argentina, Brazil, El Salvador and Peru are examples of nations where this did not occur. The Conservative Party of Venezuela disappeared following the Federal Wars of 1858–1863. Chile's conservative party, the National Party, disbanded in 1973 following a military coup and did not re-emerge as a political force following the subsequent return to democracy. Louis Hartz explained conservatism in Quebec and Latin America as a result of their settlement as feudal societies. The American conservative writer Russell Kirk provided the opinion that conservatism had been brought to the United States and interpreted the American Revolution as a "conservative revolution".

Historic conservatism in different countries
Although political conservatism developed in most countries, most countries did not have conservative parties. Many conservatives parties disappeared as the reasons for their existence disappeared. Below are listed the historic conservative parties that survive today.

Belgium 
Having its roots in the conservative Catholic Party, the Christian People's Party retained a conservative edge through the twentieth century, supporting the king in the Royal Question, supporting nuclear family as the cornerstone of society, defending Christian education, and opposing euthanasia. The Christian People's Party dominated politics in post-war Belgium. In 1999, the party's support collapsed, and it became the country's fifth-largest party. Currently, the N-VA (nieuw-vlaamse alliantie/New Flemish Alliance) is the largest party in Belgium.

Canada 

Canada's conservatives had their roots in the Tory loyalists who left America after the American Revolution. They developed in the socio-economic and political cleavages that existed during the first three decades of the 19th century and had the support of the business, professional and established Church (Anglican) elites in Ontario and to a lesser extent in Quebec. Holding a monopoly over administrative and judicial offices, they were called the "Family Compact" in Ontario and the "Chateau Clique" in Quebec. John A. Macdonald's successful leadership of the movement to confederate the provinces and his subsequent tenure as prime minister for most of the late 19th century rested on his ability to bring together the English-speaking Protestant oligarchy and the ultramontane Catholic hierarchy of Quebec and to keep them united in a conservative coalition.

The conservatives combined pro-market liberalism and Toryism. They generally supported an activist government and state intervention in the marketplace and their policies were marked by noblesse oblige, a paternalistic responsibility of the elites for the less well-off. From 1942, the party was known as the Progressive Conservatives until 2003, when the national party merged with the Canadian Alliance to form the Conservative Party of Canada.

The conservative and autonomist Union Nationale, led by Maurice Duplessis, governed the province of Quebec in periods from 1936 to 1960 and in a close alliance with the Catholic Church, small rural elites, farmers and business elites. This period, known by liberals as the Great Darkness, ended with the Quiet Revolution and the party went into terminal decline. By the end of the 1960s, the political debate in Quebec centered around the question of independence, opposing the social democratic and sovereignist Parti Québécois and the centrist and federalist Quebec Liberal Party, therefore marginalizing the conservative movement. Most French Canadian conservatives rallied either the Quebec Liberal Party or the Parti Québécois, while some of them still tried to offer an autonomist third-way with what was left of the Union Nationale or the more populists Ralliement créditiste du Québec and Parti national populaire, but by the 1981 provincial election politically organized conservatism had been obliterated in Quebec. It slowly started to revive at the 1994 provincial election with the Action démocratique du Québec, who served as Official opposition in the National Assembly from 2007 to 2008, before its merger with François Legault's Coalition Avenir Québec in 2012, that took power in 2018.

The modern Conservative Party of Canada has rebranded conservatism and under the leadership of Stephen Harper, the Conservative Party added more conservative policies.

Colombia 

The Colombian Conservative Party, founded in 1849, traces its origins to opponents of General Francisco de Paula Santander's 1833–1837 administration. While the term "liberal" had been used to describe all political forces in Colombia, the conservatives began describing themselves as "conservative liberals" and their opponents as "red liberals". From the 1860s until the present, the party has supported strong central government; supported the Catholic Church, especially its role as protector of the sanctity of the family; and opposed separation of church and state. Its policies include the legal equality of all men, the citizen's right to own property and opposition to dictatorship. It has usually been Colombia's second largest party, with the Colombian Liberal Party being the largest.

Denmark 
Founded in 1915, the Conservative People's Party of Denmark was the successor of Højre (literally "Right"). Another Danish conservative party was the Free Conservatives who were active between 1902 and 1920. The Conservative People's Party led the government coalition from 1982 to 1993. The party had previously been member of various governments from 1916 to 1917, 1940 to 1945, 1950 to 1953 and 1968 to 1971. The party was a junior partner in coalition with the Liberals from 2001 to 2011. The party is preceded by 11 years by the Young Conservatives (KU), today the youth movement of the party. The party suffered a major defeat in the parliamentary elections of September 2011 in which the party lost more than half of its seat and also lost governmental power. A liberal cultural policy dominated during the post-war period. However, by the 1990s, disagreements regarding immigrants from entirely different cultures ignited a conservative backlash. In 2015 Nye Borgerlige (The New Right) was founded promoting themselves as “true conservatives” and claiming that the Conservative People's Party had left its 'original values' behind. Since January 2021 though the Danish Opinion polls has often shown the Conservative People's Party to be the second most popular political party in Denmark among the Danish electorates. The conservative parties in Denmark have always considered the monarchy as a central institution in Denmark.

Finland 
The conservative party in Finland is the National Coalition Party (in Finnish Kansallinen Kokoomus, Kok). The party was founded in 1918, when several monarchist parties united. Although in the past the party was right-wing, today it is a moderate liberal conservative party. While the party advocates economic liberalism, it is committed to the social market economy.

France 

Conservatism in France focused on the rejection of the secularism of the French Revolution, support for the role of the Catholic Church and the restoration of the monarchy. The monarchist cause was on the verge of victory in the 1870s, but then collapsed because the proposed king, Henri, Count of Chambord, refused to fly the tri-colored flag. Religious tensions heightened in the 1890–1910 era, but moderated after the spirit of unity in fighting the First World War. An extreme form of conservatism characterized the Vichy regime of 1940–1944 with heightened antisemitism, opposition to individualism, emphasis on family life and national direction of the economy.

Following the Second World War, conservatives in France supported Gaullist groups and have been nationalistic and emphasized tradition, order and the regeneration of France. Gaullists held divergent views on social issues. The number of conservative groups, their lack of stability and their tendency to be identified with local issues defy simple categorization. Conservatism has been the major political force in France since the Second World War. Unusually, post-war French conservatism was formed around the personality of a leader, Charles de Gaulle; and did not draw on traditional French conservatism, but on the Bonapartism tradition. Gaullism in France continues under The Republicans (formerly Union for a Popular Movement), which was previously led by Nicolas Sarkozy, a conservative figure in France (see Sinistrisme). The word "conservative" itself is a term of abuse to many people in France.

Greece 

The main inter-war conservative party was called the People's Party (PP), which supported constitutional monarchy and opposed the republican Liberal Party. Both it and the Liberal party were suppressed by the authoritarian, arch-conservative and royalist 4th of August Regime of Ioannis Metaxas in 1936–1941. The PP was able to re-group after the Second World War as part of a United Nationalist Front which achieved power campaigning on a simple anticommunist, ultranationalist platform during the Greek Civil War (1946–1949). However, the vote received by the PP declined during the so-called "Centrist Interlude" in 1950–1952. In 1952, Marshal Alexandros Papagos created the Greek Rally as an umbrella for the right-wing forces. The Greek Rally came to power in 1952 and remained the leading party in Greece until 1963—after Papagos' death in 1955 reformed as the National Radical Union under Konstantinos Karamanlis. Right-wing governments backed by the palace and the army overthrew the Centre Union government in 1965 and governed the country until the establishment of the far-right Greek junta (1967–1974). After the regime's collapse in August 1974, Karamanlis returned from exile to lead the government and founded the New Democracy party. The new conservative party had four objectives: to confront Turkish expansionism in Cyprus, to reestablish and solidify democratic rule, to give the country a strong government and to make a powerful moderate party a force in Greek politics.

The Independent Greeks, a newly formed political party in Greece, has also supported conservatism, particularly national and religious conservatism. The Founding Declaration of the Independent Greeks strongly emphasises in the preservation of the Greek state and its sovereignty, the Greek people and the Greek Orthodox Church.

Iceland 
Founded in 1924 as the Conservative Party, Iceland's Independence Party adopted its current name in 1929 after the merger with the Liberal Party. From the beginning, they have been the largest vote-winning party, averaging around 40%. They combined liberalism and conservatism, supported nationalization of infrastructure and opposed class conflict. While mostly in opposition during the 1930s, they embraced economic liberalism, but accepted the welfare state after the war and participated in governments supportive of state intervention and protectionism. Unlike other Scandanivian conservative (and liberal) parties, it has always had a large working-class following. After the financial crisis in 2008, the party has sunk to a lower support level around 20–25%.

Luxembourg 
Luxembourg's major conservative party, the Christian Social People's Party (CSV or PCS), was formed as the Party of the Right in 1914 and adopted its present name in 1945. It was consistently the largest political party in Luxembourg, and dominated politics throughout the 20th century.

Norway 
The Conservative Party of Norway (Norwegian: Høyre, literally "right") was formed by the old upper class of state officials and wealthy merchants to fight the populist democracy of the Liberal Party, but lost power in 1884, when parliamentarian government was first practised. It formed its first government under parliamentarism in 1889 and continued to alternate in power with the Liberals until the 1930s, when Labour became the dominant political party. It has elements both of paternalism, stressing the responsibilities of the state, and of economic liberalism. It first returned to power in the 1960s. During Kåre Willoch's premiership in the 1980s, much emphasis was laid on liberalizing the credit and housing market, and abolishing the NRK TV and radio monopoly, while supporting law and order in criminal justice and traditional norms in education

Sweden 

Sweden's conservative party, the Moderate Party, was formed in 1904, two years after the founding of the Liberal Party. The party emphasizes tax reductions, deregulation of private enterprise and privatization of schools, hospitals, and kindergartens.

Switzerland 
There are a number of conservative parties in Switzerland's parliament, the Federal Assembly. These include the largest, the Swiss People's Party (SVP), the Christian Democratic People's Party (CVP) and the Conservative Democratic Party of Switzerland (BDP), which is a splinter of the SVP created in the aftermath to the election of Eveline Widmer-Schlumpf as Federal Council. The right-wing parties have a majority in the Federal Assembly.

The Swiss People's Party (SVP or UDC) was formed from the 1971 merger of the Party of Farmers, Traders and Citizens, formed in 1917 and the smaller Swiss Democratic Party, formed in 1942. The SVP emphasized agricultural policy and was strong among farmers in German-speaking Protestant areas. As Switzerland considered closer relations with the European Union in the 1990s, the SVP adopted a more militant protectionist and isolationist stance. This stance has allowed it to expand into German-speaking Catholic mountainous areas. The Anti-Defamation League, a non-Swiss lobby group based in the United States has accused them of manipulating issues such as immigration, Swiss neutrality and welfare benefits, awakening antisemitism and racism. The Council of Europe has called the SVP "extreme right", although some scholars dispute this classification. For instance, Hans-Georg Betz describes it as "populist radical right". The SVP is the largest party since 2003.

Ukraine 
Authoritarian Ukrainian State headed by Pavlo Skoropadskyi represented the conservative movement. The 1918 Hetman government, which appealed to the tradition of the 17th–18th century Cossack Hetman state, represented the conservative strand in Ukraine's struggle for independence. It had the support of the proprietary classes and of conservative and moderate political groups. Vyacheslav Lypynsky was a main ideologue of Ukrainian conservatism.

United Kingdom 

According to historian James Sack, English conservatives celebrate Edmund Burke, who was Irish, as their intellectual father. Burke was affiliated with the Whig Party which eventually became the Liberal Party, but the modern Conservative Party is generally thought to derive from the Tory party and the MPs of the modern conservative party are still frequently referred to as Tories.

Shortly after Burke's death in 1797, conservatism revived as a mainstream political force as the Whigs suffered a series of internal divisions. This new generation of conservatives derived their politics not from Burke, but from his predecessor, the Viscount Bolingbroke (1678–1751), who was a Jacobite and traditional Tory, lacking Burke's sympathies for Whiggish policies such as Catholic emancipation and American independence (famously attacked by Samuel Johnson in "Taxation No Tyranny"). In the first half of the 19th century, many newspapers, magazines, and journals promoted loyalist or right-wing attitudes in religion, politics and international affairs. Burke was seldom mentioned, but William Pitt the Younger (1759–1806) became a conspicuous hero. The most prominent journals included The Quarterly Review, founded in 1809 as a counterweight to the Whigs' Edinburgh Review and the even more conservative Blackwood's Edinburgh Magazine. Sack finds that the Quarterly Review promoted a balanced Canningite toryism as it was neutral on Catholic emancipation and only mildly critical of Nonconformist Dissent; it opposed slavery and supported the current poor laws; and it was "aggressively imperialist". The high-church clergy of the Church of England read the Orthodox Churchman's Magazine which was equally hostile to Jewish, Catholic, Jacobin, Methodist and Unitarian spokesmen. Anchoring the ultra Tories, Blackwood's Edinburgh Magazine stood firmly against Catholic emancipation and favoured slavery, cheap money, mercantilism, the Navigation Acts and the Holy Alliance.

Conservatism evolved after 1820, embracing free trade in 1846 and a commitment to democracy, especially under Disraeli. The effect was to significantly strengthen conservatism as a grassroots political force. Conservatism no longer was the philosophical defense of the landed aristocracy, but had been refreshed into redefining its commitment to the ideals of order, both secular and religious, expanding imperialism, strengthened monarchy and a more generous vision of the welfare state as opposed to the punitive vision of the Whigs and liberals. As early as 1835, Disraeli attacked the Whigs and utilitarians as slavishly devoted to an industrial oligarchy, while he described his fellow Tories as the only "really democratic party of England" and devoted to the interests of the whole people. Nevertheless, inside the party there was a tension between the growing numbers of wealthy businessmen on the one side and the aristocracy and rural gentry on the other. The aristocracy gained strength as businessmen discovered they could use their wealth to buy a peerage and a country estate.

Although conservatives opposed attempts to allow greater representation of the middle class in parliament, they conceded that electoral reform could not be reversed and promised to support further reforms so long as they did not erode the institutions of church and state. These new principles were presented in the Tamworth Manifesto of 1834, which historians regard as the basic statement of the beliefs of the new Conservative Party.

Some conservatives lamented the passing of a pastoral world where the ethos of noblesse oblige had promoted respect from the lower classes. They saw the Anglican Church and the aristocracy as balances against commercial wealth. They worked toward legislation for improved working conditions and urban housing. This viewpoint would later be called Tory democracy. However, since Burke, there has always been tension between traditional aristocratic conservatism and the wealthy business class.

In 1834, Tory Prime Minister Robert Peel issued the Tamworth Manifesto in which he pledged to endorse moderate political reform. This marked the beginning of the transformation of British conservatism from High Tory reactionism towards a more modern form based on "conservation". The party became known as the Conservative Party as a result, a name it has retained to this day. However, Peel would also be the root of a split in the party between the traditional Tories (by the Earl of Derby and Benjamin Disraeli) and the "Peelites" (led first by Peel himself, then by the Earl of Aberdeen). The split occurred in 1846 over the issue of free trade, which Peel supported, versus protectionism, supported by Derby. The majority of the party sided with Derby whilst about a third split away, eventually merging with the Whigs and the radicals to form the Liberal Party. Despite the split, the mainstream Conservative Party accepted the doctrine of free trade in 1852.

In the second half of the 19th century, the Liberal Party faced political schisms, especially over Irish Home Rule. Leader William Gladstone (himself a former Peelite) sought to give Ireland a degree of autonomy, a move that elements in both the left and right-wings of his party opposed. These split off to become the Liberal Unionists (led by Joseph Chamberlain), forming a coalition with the Conservatives before merging with them in 1912. The Liberal Unionist influence dragged the Conservative Party towards the left as Conservative governments passing a number of progressive reforms at the turn of the 20th century. By the late 19th century, the traditional business supporters of the Liberal Party had joined the Conservatives, making them the party of business and commerce.

After a period of Liberal dominance before the First World War, the Conservatives gradually became more influential in government, regaining full control of the cabinet in 1922. In the inter-war period, conservatism was the major ideology in Britain as the Liberal Party vied with the Labour Party for control of the left. After the Second World War, the first Labour government (1945–1951) under Clement Attlee embarked on a program of nationalization of industry and the promotion of social welfare. The Conservatives generally accepted those policies until the 1980s.

In the 1980s, the Conservative government of Margaret Thatcher, guided by neoliberal economics, reversed many of Labour's programmes. The Conservative Party also adopt soft eurosceptic politics, and oppose Federal Europe. Other conservative political parties, such as the United Kingdom Independence Party (UKIP, founded in 1993), Northern Ireland's Ulster Unionist Party (UUP) and the Democratic Unionist Party (DUP, founded in 1971), began to appear, although they have yet to make any significant impact at Westminster (the DUP comprises the largest political party in the ruling coalition in the Northern Ireland Assembly), and from 2017 to 2019 the DUP provided support for the Conservative minority government.

Modern conservatism in different countries
Many sources refer to any political parties on the right of the political spectrum as conservative despite having no connection with historical conservatism. In most cases, these parties do not use the term conservative in their name or self-identify as conservative. Below is a partial list of such political parties.

Australia 

The Liberal Party of Australia adheres to the principles of social conservatism and liberal conservatism. It is liberal in the sense of economics. Other conservative parties are the National Party of Australia, a sister party of the Liberals, Family First Party, Democratic Labor Party, Shooters, Fishers and Farmers Party, Australian Conservatives, and the Katter's Australian Party.

The largest party in the country is the Australian Labor Party and its dominant faction is Labor Right, a socially conservative element. Australia undertook significant economic reform under the Labor Party in the mid-1980s. Consequently, issues like protectionism, welfare reform, privatization and deregulation are no longer debated in the political space as they are in Europe or North America. Moser and Catley explain: "In America, 'liberal' means left-of-center, and it is a pejorative term when used by conservatives in adversarial political debate. In Australia, of course, the conservatives are in the Liberal Party." Jupp writes that "[the] decline in English influences on Australian reformism and radicalism, and appropriation of the symbols of Empire by conservatives continued under the Liberal Party leadership of Sir Robert Menzies, which lasted until 1966".

Brazil 

Conservatism in Brazil originates from the cultural and historical tradition of Brazil, whose cultural roots are Luso-Iberian and Roman Catholic. Brazilian conservatism from the 20th century on includes names such as Mário Ferreira dos Santos and Vicente Ferreira da Silva in philosophy; Gerardo Melo Mourão and Otto Maria Carpeaux in literature; Bruno Tolentino in poetry; Olavo de Carvalho, Paulo Francis and Luís Ernesto Lacombe in journalism; Manuel de Oliveira Lima and João Camilo de Oliveira Torres in historiography; Sobral Pinto and Miguel Reale in law; Gustavo Corção, Plinio Corrêa de Oliveira, Father Léo and Father Paulo Ricardo in the Catholic Church; Roberto Campos and Mario Henrique Simonsen in economics; Joaquim Nabuco, Carlos Lacerda and former president Jair Bolsonaro in the political arena.

Brazil Union, Progressistas, Republicans, Liberal Party, Brazilian Labour Renewal Party, Patriota, Brazilian Labour Party, Social Christian Party and Brasil 35 are the conservative parties in Brazil.

Germany 

Conservatism developed alongside nationalism in Germany, culminating in Germany's victory over France in the Franco-Prussian War, the creation of the unified German Empire in 1871 and the simultaneous rise of Otto von Bismarck on the European political stage. Bismarck's "balance of power" model maintained peace in Europe for decades at the end of the 19th century. His "revolutionary conservatism" was a conservative state-building strategy designed to make ordinary Germans—not just the Junker elite—more loyal to state and emperor, he created the modern welfare state in Germany in the 1880s. According to Kees van Kersbergen and Barbara Vis, his strategy was: 

Bismarck also enacted universal male suffrage in the new German Empire in 1871. He became a great hero to German conservatives, who erected many monuments to his memory after he left office in 1890.

With the rise of Nazism in 1933, agrarian movements faded and was supplanted by a more command-based economy and forced social integration. Though Adolf Hitler succeeded in garnering the support of many German industrialists, prominent traditionalists openly and secretly opposed his policies of euthanasia, genocide and attacks on organized religion, including Claus von Stauffenberg, Dietrich Bonhoeffer, Henning von Tresckow, Bishop Clemens August Graf von Galen and the monarchist Carl Friedrich Goerdeler.

More recently, the work of conservative Christian Democratic Union leader and Chancellor Helmut Kohl helped bring about German reunification, along with the closer European integration in the form of the Maastricht Treaty.
Today, German conservatism is often associated with politicians such as Chancellor Angela Merkel, whose tenure has been marked by attempts to save the common European currency (Euro) from demise. The German conservatives are divided under Merkel due to the refugee crisis in Germany and many conservatives in the CDU/CSU oppose the refugee and migrant policies developed under Merkel.

India 

In India, the Bharatiya Janata Party (BJP), led by Narendra Modi, represent conservative politics. The BJP is the largest right-wing conservative party in the world. It promotes cultural nationalism, Hindu Nationalism, an aggressive foreign policy against Pakistan and a conservative social and fiscal policy.

Italy 
By 1945, the extreme-right Italian fascist movement of Benito Mussolini was discredited. 
After World War II, in Italy the conservative parties were dominated by the centrist Christian Democracy (DC) party. With its landslide victory over the left in 1948, the center (including progressive and conservative factions) was in power and was, says Denis Mack Smith, "moderately conservative, reasonably tolerant of everything which did not touch religion or property, but above all Catholic and sometimes clerical." It dominated politics until the DC party's dissolution in 1994.

In 1994, the media tycoon and entrepreneur Silvio Berlusconi founded the liberal conservative party Forza Italia (FI). Berlusconi won three elections in 1994, 2001 and 2008, governing the country for almost ten years as Prime Minister. Forza Italia formed a coalition with right-wing regional party Lega Nord while in government.  Besides FI, now the conservative ideas are mainly expressed by the New Centre-Right party led by Angelino Alfano, Berlusconi formed a new party, which is a rebirth of Forza Italia, thus founding a new conservative movement. Alfano served as Minister of Foreign Affairs. After the 2018 election, Lega Nord and the Five Star Movement formed a right-wing populist government, which later failed. After the 2022 Italian general election, conservative political forces returned in government, namely the League, Forza Italia and FdI.

Russia 

Under Vladimir Putin, the dominant leader since 1999, Russia has promoted explicitly conservative policies in social, cultural and political matters, both at home and abroad. Putin has attacked globalism and economic liberalism. Russian conservatism is unique in some respects as it supports Economic intervention with a mixed economy, with a strong nationalist sentiment and social conservatism with its views being largely populist. Russian conservatism as a result opposes libertarian ideals such as the aforementioned concept of economic liberalism found in other conservative movements around the world. Putin has as a result promoted new think tanks that bring together like-minded intellectuals and writers. For example, the Izborsky Club, founded in 2012 by Aleksandr Prokhanov, stresses Russian nationalism, the restoration of Russia's historical greatness and systematic opposition to liberal ideas and policies. Vladislav Surkov, a senior government official, has been one of the key ideologists during Putin's presidency.

In cultural and social affairs, Putin has collaborated closely with the Russian Orthodox Church. Mark Woods provides specific examples of how the Church under Patriarch Kirill of Moscow has backed the expansion of Russian power into Crimea and eastern Ukraine. More broadly, The New York Times reports in September 2016 how that Church's policy prescriptions support the Kremlin's appeal to social conservatives:

South Korea 

South Korea's major conservative party, the People Power Party (South Korea), has changed its form throughout its history. First it was the Democratic-Liberal Party(민주자유당, Minju Ja-yudang) and its first head was Roh Tae-woo who was the first President of the Sixth Republic of South Korea. Democratic-Liberal Party was founded by the merging of Roh Tae-woo's Democratic Justice Party, Kim Young Sam's Reunification Democratic Party and Kim Jong-pil's New Democratic Republican Party. And again through election its second leader, Kim Young-sam, became the fourteenth President of Korea. When the conservative party was beaten by the opposition party in the general election, it changed its form again to follow the party members' demand for reforms. It became the New Korean Party, but it changed again one year later since the President Kim Young-sam was blamed by the citizen for the International Monetary Fund. It changed its name to Grand National Party (GNP). Since the late Kim Dae-jung assumed the presidency in 1998, GNP had been the opposition party until Lee Myung-bak won the presidential election of 2007.

Singapore 

Singapore's only conservative party is the People's Action Party (PAP). It is currently in government and has been in government since independence in 1965. It has promoted conservative values in the form of Asian democracy and values or 'shared values'. The main party on the left of the political spectrum in Singapore is the Workers' Party (WP).

United States 

The meaning of conservatism in the United States has little in common with the way the word is used elsewhere. As Ribuffo (2011) notes, "what Americans now call conservatism much of the world calls liberalism or neoliberalism". American conservatism is a broad system of political beliefs in the United States that is characterized by respect for American traditions, support for Judeo-Christian values, economic liberalism, anti-communism, and a defense of Western culture. Liberty within the bounds of conformity to conservatism is a core value, with a particular emphasis on strengthening the free market, limiting the size and scope of government and opposition to high taxes and government or labor union encroachment on the entrepreneur.

The 1830s Democratic Party became divided between Southern Democrats, who supported slavery, secession, and later segregation, and the Northern Democrats, who tended to support the abolition of slavery, union, and equality. Many Democrats were conservative in the sense that they wanted things to be like they were in the past, especially as far as race was concerned. They generally favored poorer farmers and urban workers, and were hostile to banks and industrialization and high tariffs.

The post-Civil War Republican Party elected the first People of Color to serve in both local and national political office. The Southern Democrats united with pro-segregation Northern Republicans to form the Conservative Coalition, which successfully put an end to Blacks being elected to national political office until 1967, when Edward Brooke was elected Senator from Massachusetts.

In late 19th century, the Democratic Party split into two factions; the more conservative Eastern business faction (led by Grover Cleveland) favored gold, while the South and West (led by William Jennings Bryan) wanted more silver in order to raise prices for their crops.  In 1892, Cleveland won the election on a conservative platform, which supported maintaining the gold standard, reducing tariffs, and taking a laisse-faire approach to government intervention. A severe nationwide depression ruined his plans.  Many of his supporters in 1896 supported the Gold Democrats when liberal William Jennings Bryan won the nomination and campaigned for bimetalism, money backed by both gold and silver. The conservative wing nominated Alton B. Parker in 1904, but he got very few votes.

Since the 1920s, conservatism in the United States has been chiefly associated with the Republican Party. During the era of segregation, many Southern Democrats were conservatives and they played a key role in the conservative coalition that largely controlled domestic policy in Congress from 1937 to 1963. The conservative Democrats continued to have influence in the US politics until 1994's Republican Revolution, when the American South shifted from solid Democrat to solid Republican, while maintaining its conservative values.

The major conservative party in the United States today is the Republican Party, also known as the GOP (Grand Old Party). Modern American conservatives consider individual liberty, as long as it conforms to conservative values, small government, deregulation of the government, economic liberalism, and free trade, as the fundamental trait of democracy, which contrasts with modern American liberals, who generally place a greater value on social equality and social justice. Other major priorities within American conservatism include support for the traditional family, law and order, the right to bear arms, Christian values, anti-communism and a defense of "Western civilization from the challenges of modernist culture and totalitarian governments". Economic conservatives and libertarians favor small government, low taxes, limited regulation and free enterprise. Some social conservatives see traditional social values threatened by secularism, so they support school prayer and oppose abortion and homosexuality. Neoconservatives want to expand American ideals throughout the world and show a strong support for Israel. Paleoconservatives, in opposition to multiculturalism, press for restrictions on immigration. Most US conservatives prefer Republicans over Democrats and most factions favor a strong foreign policy and a strong military. The conservative movement of the 1950s attempted to bring together these divergent strands, stressing the need for unity to prevent the spread of "godless communism", which Reagan later labeled an "evil empire". During the Reagan administration, conservatives also supported the so-called "Reagan Doctrine" under which the US as part of a Cold War strategy provided military and other support to guerrilla insurgencies that were fighting governments identified as socialist or communist. The Reagan administration also adopted neoliberalism and Reaganomics (pejoratively referred to as trickle-down economics), resulting in the 1980s economic growth and trillion-dollar deficits.

Other modern conservative positions include opposition to big government and opposition to environmentalism. On average, American conservatives desire tougher foreign policies than liberals do. Economic liberalism, deregulation and social conservatism are major principles of the Republican Party.

The Tea Party movement, founded in 2009, had proven a large outlet for populist American conservative ideas. Their stated goals included rigorous adherence to the US constitution, lower taxes, and opposition to a growing role for the federal government in health care. Electorally, it was considered a key force in Republicans reclaiming control of the US House of Representatives in 2010.

Psychology

Conscientiousness 
The Big Five Personality Model has applications in the study of political psychology. It has been found by several studies that individuals who score high in Conscientiousness (the quality of working hard and being careful) are more likely to possess a right-wing political identification. On the opposite end of the spectrum, a strong correlation was identified between high scores in Openness to Experience and a left-leaning ideology.

Personality psychology research has shown that conservatism is positively correlated to conscientiousness and negatively correlated with openness to new experiences. Because conscientiousness is positively related to job performance, a 2021 study found that conservative service workers earn higher ratings, evaluations, and tips than liberal ones.

Authoritarianism 
Following the Second World War, psychologists conducted research into the different motives and tendencies that account for ideological differences between left and right. The early studies focused on conservatives, beginning with Theodor W. Adorno's The Authoritarian Personality (1950) based on the F-scale personality test. This book has been heavily criticized on theoretical and methodological grounds, but some of its findings have been confirmed by further empirical research.

According to psychologist Bob Altemeyer, individuals who are politically conservative tend to rank high in right-wing authoritarianism (RWA) on his RWA scale. This finding was echoed by Adorno. A study done on Israeli and Palestinian students in Israel found that RWA scores of right-wing party supporters were significantly higher than those of left-wing party supporters. However, a 2005 study by H. Michael Crowson and colleagues suggested a moderate gap between RWA and other conservative positions, stating that their "results indicated that conservatism is not synonymous with RWA".

Ambiguity tolerance–intolerance 
In 1973, British psychologist Glenn Wilson published an influential book providing evidence that a general factor underlying conservative beliefs is "fear of uncertainty." A meta-analysis of research literature by Jost, Glaser, Kruglanski, and Sulloway in 2003 found that many factors, such as intolerance of ambiguity and need for cognitive closure, contribute to the degree of one's political conservatism and its manifestations in decision-making. A study by Kathleen Maclay stated these traits "might be associated with such generally valued characteristics as personal commitment and unwavering loyalty". The research also suggested that while most people are resistant to change, liberals are more tolerant of it.

Social dominance orientation 
Psychologist Felicia Pratto and her colleagues have found evidence to support the idea that a high social dominance orientation (SDO) is strongly correlated with conservative political views and opposition to social engineering to promote equality. Pratto and her colleagues also found that high SDO scores were highly correlated with measures of prejudice.

However, David J. Schneider argued for a more complex relationships between the three factors, writing that "correlations between prejudice and political conservative are reduced virtually to zero when controls for SDO are instituted, suggesting that the conservatism–prejudice link is caused by SDO". Conservative political theorist Kenneth Minogue criticized Pratto's work, saying:

A 1996 study on the relationship between racism and conservatism found that the correlation was stronger among more educated individuals, though "anti-Black affect had essentially no relationship with political conservatism at any level of educational or intellectual sophistication". They also found that the correlation between racism and conservatism could be entirely accounted for by their mutual relationship with social dominance orientation.

Happiness 
In his book Gross National Happiness (2008), Arthur C. Brooks presents the finding that conservatives are roughly twice as happy as liberals. A 2008 study demonstrated that conservatives tend to be happier than liberals because of their tendency to justify the current state of affairs and to remain unbothered by inequalities in society. In fact, as income inequality increases, this difference in relative happiness increases because conservatives, more so than liberals, possess an ideological buffer against the negative effects of economic inequality. A 2012 study disputed this.

See also

Conservatism in Australia
Conservatism in Canada
Conservatism in Hong Kong
Conservatism in India
Conservatism in New Zealand
Conservatism in North America
Conservatism in Pakistan
Conservatism in Russia
Conservatism in South Korea
Conservatism in Taiwan
Conservatism in the United Kingdom
Conservatism in the United States
Black conservatism
Fiscal conservatism
Liberal conservatism
Libertarian conservatism
National conservatism
Social conservatism
Traditionalist conservatism

References

Bibliography 

 
 
 
 Hainsworth, Paul. The extreme right in Western Europe, Abingdon, OXON: Routledge, 2008 .
 
 
 
 
 
 
 Osterling, Jorge P. Democracy in Colombia: Clientelist Politics and Guerrilla Warfare. New Brunswick, NJ: Transaction Publishers, 1989 .
 
 Winthrop, Norman and Lovell, David W. "Varieties of Conservative Theory". In Winthrop, Norman. Liberal Democratic Theory and Its Critics. Beckenham, Kent: Croom Helm Ltd., 1983 .
 Freeman, James. “Neoliberalism and Conservatism in Britain.” In The Neoliberal Age?: Britain since the 1970s, edited by Aled Davies, Ben Jackson, and Florence Sutcliffe-Braithwaite, 254–76. UCL Press, 2021. .
 Katharine M. Donato, and Samantha L. Perez. “A Different Hue of the Gender Gap: Latino Immigrants and Political Conservatism in the United States.” RSF: The Russell Sage Foundation Journal of the Social Sciences, vol. 2, no. 3, 2016, pp. 98–124, . Accessed 16 Apr. 2022.
 Youngs, Richard, Gareth Fowler, ARTHUR LAROK, PAWEŁ MARCZEWSKI, GHIA NODIA VIJAYAN MJ, NATALIA SHAPOVALOVA, JANJIRA SOMBATPOONSIRI, MARISA VON BÜLOW, and ÖZGE ZIHNIOĞLU. “OVERVIEW: CONSERVATIVE CIVIL SOCIETY ON THE RISE.” Edited by RICHARD YOUNGS. THE MOBILIZATION OF CONSERVATIVE CIVIL SOCIETY. Carnegie Endowment for International Peace, 2018. .
 BRUMLIK, MICHA. “CONSERVATISM.” In The Habermas Handbook, edited by HAUKE BRUNKHORST, REGINA KREIDE, and CRISTINA LAFONT, 507–12. Columbia University Press, 2018. .
 Huntington, John S. “EPILOGUE.: The Influence of Far-Right Conservatism.” In Far-Right Vanguard: The Radical Roots of Modern Conservatism, 209–20. University of Pennsylvania Press, 2021. .
 VAN DELDEN, MAARTEN. “Conservatism.” In Reality in Movement: Octavio Paz as Essayist and Public Intellectual, 179–98. Vanderbilt University Press, 2021. .
 FAWCETT, E. (2020). Character, Outlook, and Labelling of Conservatism. In Conservatism: The Fight for a Tradition (pp. 41–68). Princeton University Press. .
 CHEBANKOVA, E. (2020). Conservatism. In Political Ideologies in Contemporary Russia (pp. 58–86). McGill-Queen’s University Press. . 
 Burke, Kyle. “Crossroads of Conservatism.” In Revolutionaries for the Right: Anticommunist Internationalism and Paramilitary Warfare in the Cold War, 28–54. University of North Carolina Press, 2018. .
 Cotto, J. (2020). WHO FUNDS CONSERVATISM, INC.? In P. Gottfried (Ed.), The Vanishing Tradition: Perspectives on American Conservatism (pp. 62–67). Cornell University Press. 
 ROBINSON, P. (2019). BETWEEN REVOLUTIONS. In Russian Conservatism (pp. 115–130). Cornell University Press. .
 Lynn, Joshua A. “CONCLUSION: American Democracy, American Conservatism.” In Preserving the White Man’s Republic: Jacksonian Democracy, Race, and the Transformation of American Conservatism, 175–80. University of Virginia Press, 2019. .
 Krul, Wessel. “Conservatism, Republicanism, and Romanticism: Thomas Mann’s ‘Conversion’ to Democracy in 1922.” In Discourses of Decline: Essays on Republicanism in Honor of Wyger R.E. Velema, edited by Joris Oddens, Mart Rutjes, and Arthur Weststeijn, 216–32. Brill, 2022. .
 LEWIS, DAVID G. “Carl Schmitt and Russian Conservatism.” In Russia’s New Authoritarianism: Putin and the Politics of Order, 24–48. Edinburgh University Press, 2020. .
 WISEMAN, NELSON. “Provincial Conservatism.” In Conservatism in Canada, edited by JAMES FARNEY and DAVID RAYSIDE, 209–30. University of Toronto Press, 2013. .
 Elmaliach, Tal, and Haim Watzman. “The Leadership’s Response: Revolutionary Conservatism.” In Hakibbutz Ha’artzi, Mapam, and the Demise of the Israeli Labor Movement, 132–43. Syracuse University Press, 2020. .
 MITCHELL, MARK T. “Afterword: A Conservatism Worth Conserving, or Conservatism as Stewardship.” In The Limits of Liberalism: Tradition, Individualism, and the Crisis of Freedom, 269–73. University of Notre Dame Press, 2019. .
 Williams, Michael C. “Conservatism, Civility, and the Challenges of International Political Theory.” In The Civil Condition in World Politics: Beyond Tragedy and Utopianism, edited by Vassilios Paipais, 1st ed., 132–52. Bristol University Press, 2022. .
 Huntington, John S. “Radical Patriots.” In Far-Right Vanguard: The Radical Roots of Modern Conservatism, 45–78. University of Pennsylvania Press, 2021. .
 Reno, R. R. “The Theological Roots of Modern Conservatism.” In The Identity of Israel’s God in Christian Scripture, edited by Don Collett, Mark Elliott, Mark Gignilliat, and Ephraim Radner, 381–96. The Society of Biblical Literature, 2020. .
 Witcher, Marcus M. “The Battle for Fiscal Conservatism: Supply-Siders v. Budget Hawks.” In Getting Right with Reagan: The Struggle for True Conservatism, 1980–2016, 26–46. University Press of Kansas, 2019. .
 PIMPARE, STEPHEN. “CONSERVATISM IS NOT CONSERVATIVE AND SOME OF US ARE MORE POLARIZED THAN OTHERS.” In Politics for Social Workers: A Practical Guide to Effecting Change, 55–64. Columbia University Press, 2022. .
 Aughey, Arthur. “Postscript: Conservatism Confounded.” In The Conservative Party and the Nation: Union, England and Europe, 150–58. Manchester University Press, 2018. .
 GIBBS, DAVID N. “EVANGELICAL CHRISTIANITY, BIG BUSINESS, AND THE RESURGENCE OF AMERICAN CONSERVATISM DURING THE 1970S.” In Religion, Secularism, and Political Belonging, edited by LEEROM MEDOVOI and ELIZABETH BENTLEY, 207–22. Duke University Press, 2021. .
 Fried, Amy, and Douglas B. Harris. “HERE TO HELP?: Movement Conservatism and the State in the Reagan Era.” In At War with Government: How Conservatives Weaponized Distrust from Goldwater to Trump, 46–85. Columbia University Press, 2021. .
 Lee, Michael J. “Conservatism and Canonicity.” In Creating Conservatism: Postwar Words That Made an American Movement, 193–206. Michigan State University Press, 2014. .

Further reading 

  312 pages; scholarly essays giving a global perspective on women in right-wing politics.
 
 
  
  
  
  
  
  
  
  
  
  
  
  
  
  
   
  
  
   
  
  
   
   
 Crowson, N. J. Facing Fascism: The Conservative Party and the European Dictators, 1935–1940. 1997.
 Crunden, Robert Morse. The Superfluous Men: Critics of American Culture, 1900–1945. 1999.
 Dalrymple, Theodore. Our Culture, What's Left of It: The Mandarins and the Masses. 2005.
 Fryer, Russell G. Recent Conservative Political Thought: American Perspectives. 1979.
 Gottfried, Paul E. The Conservative Movement. 1993.
 Nugent, Neill. The British Right: Conservative and Right Wing Politics in Britain. 1977.
 Honderich, Ted. Conservatism. 1990.
 Kirk, Russell. The Conservative Mind. 2001.
 Bacchetta, Paola. Right-Wing Women: From Conservatives to Extremists Around the World. 2002.
 Nisbet, Robert. Conservatism: Dream and Reality. 2001.
 O'Sullivan, Noel. Conservatism. 1976.
 Pafford, John M. The Forgotten Conservative: Rediscovering Grover Cleveland (Simon and Schuster, 2013). excerpt 
 Scruton, Roger. The Meaning of Conservatism. 1980.
 Woodwards, E.L. Three Studies In European Conservatism. Mettenich: Guizot: The Catholic Church In The Nineteenth Century (1923) online

Primary sources 
 Schneider, Gregory L. ed. Conservatism in America Since 1930: A Reader. 2003.
 Witonski, Peter, ed. The Wisdom of Conservatism. (4 vol. Arlington House; 1971). 2396 pages; worldwide sources.

External links 

 Conservatism an article by Encyclopædia Britannica.
 
 
 Conservatism. Kieron O'Hara. Reaktion Books. 2011 (reviewed in The Montreal Review).

 
 
Social theories